Maksym Petrovych Navrotskyi (born 29 June 2000) is a Ukrainian professional footballer who plays as a centre-forward for Croatian club Zagreb.

References

External links
 
 
 

2000 births
Living people
People from Bila Tserkva
Ukrainian footballers
Association football forwards
MFA Mukachevo players
FC Mynai players
FC Kremin Kremenchuk players
NK Maksimir players
NK Zagreb players
Ukrainian First League players
Ukrainian expatriate footballers
Expatriate footballers in Germany
Ukrainian expatriate sportspeople in Germany
Expatriate footballers in Poland
Ukrainian expatriate sportspeople in Poland
Expatriate footballers in Croatia
Ukrainian expatriate sportspeople in Croatia
Sportspeople from Kyiv Oblast